Heyuannia ("from Heyuan") is a genus of oviraptorid dinosaur that lived in Asia during the Late Cretaceous epoch, in what is now China and Mongolia. It was the first oviraptorid found in China; most others were found in neighbouring Mongolia. Two species are known: H. huangi, named by Lü Junchang in 2002 from the Dalangshan Formation; and H. yanshini, originally named as a separate genus Ingenia from the Barun Goyot Formation by Rinchen Barsbold in 1981, and later renamed to Ajancingenia in 2013 due to the preoccupation of Ingenia. The latter name was eventually discarded due to various ethical issues surrounding the author.

Discovery and naming

H. huangi

The type species, Heyuannia huangi, was named and described by Lü Junchang in 2002. The generic name refers to the city of Heyuan. The specific name honours Huang Dong, the director of the Heyuan Museum. The holotype, HYMV1-1, was discovered in Guangdong near Huangsha in layers of the Dalangshan Formation. It consists of a partial skeleton, including the skull. Six further skeletons were assigned as paratypes or referred to the species. Multiple other fossils have been found, including one which may retain possible reproductive organs. Thousands of eggs have also been uncovered at the site, some of them belonging to the genus and likely laid by Heyuannia.

H. yanshini

H. yanshini was first described and named by Rinchen Barsbold in 1981, as a new genus and species Ingenia yanshini. The name "Ingenia" derives from the Ingen Khoboor Depression of Bayankhongor Province (Barun Goyot Formation), Mongolia, from whence it was collected, while the specific name yanshini was chosen in honour of academician Aleksandr Leonidovich Yanshin (1911–1999), who was adviser and mentor to Rinchen Barsbold during his time at the Paleontological Institute in St. Petersburg, Russia. Most of the material known for this is species actually a composite of four specimens, including the holotype skull of Conchoraptor.

The generic name Ingenia was preoccupied by the generic name of Ingenia mirabilis (Gerlach, 1957), a tripyloidid nematode. Thus, an alternative generic name, Ajancingenia, was proposed by Jesse Easter in 2013. The replacement generic name is derived also from ajanc (аянч; a traveler in Mongolian), as a Western allusion to sticking one's thumb out for hitchhiking, in reference to the first manual ungual of Ajancingenia which is twice as large as the second. In 2018, Gregory Funston et al. noted that Easter's redescription had "several ethical problems", including plaigiarized text. Although this is not enough reason to invalidate Ajancingenia, they reclassified it as a species of Heyuannia, creating the new combination Heyuannia yanshini, in order to avoid an ethical dilemma. This assignment has been accepted by many papers since.

Description
Heyuannia is a medium-sized oviraptorid. Gregory S. Paul in 2010 estimated its length at 1.5 metres, the weight at twenty kilograms. Its toothless skull is relatively short with a steep snout. It had very short arms and digits, and its first digit was reduced.

Classification

Heyuannia was assigned by Lü to the Oviraptoridae in 2002. Its exact placement within this group is uncertain. Later analyses either resulted in a position in the Oviraptorinae or the Ingeniinae. According to Lü the morphology of the shoulder girdle of Heyuannia supports the hypothesis that oviraptorosaurians were secondarily flightless birds.

The following cladogram follows the 2017 phylogenetic analysis by Funston and colleagues:

Paleobiology

Preservation of the pigments biliverdin and protoporphyrin in eggshells belonging to Heyuannia indicate that they were blue-green in color. This coloration allowed for both camouflage and sexual signalling, also seen in American robins and ratites. The arrangement of the eggshells suggests a partially open nest arrangement for Heyuannia, and also indicates that it engaged in increased parental care.

See also

 Timeline of oviraptorosaur research

References

Oviraptorids
Late Cretaceous dinosaurs of Asia
Maastrichtian life
Fossils of China
Paleontology in Guangdong
Fossils of Mongolia
Barun Goyot Formation
Fossil taxa described in 2002
Taxa named by Lü Junchang